The 1924 Maryland Aggies football team was an American football team that represented the University of Maryland in the Southern Conference (SoCon) during the 1924 college football season. In their 14th season under head coach Curley Byrd, the Aggies compiled a 3–3–3 record (1–2–1 against SoCon opponents), finished 16th place in the conference, and were outscored by a total of 78 to 74.

Schedule

References

Maryland
Maryland Terrapins football seasons
Maryland Aggies football